James Greeley (born 12 September 1945) is an Irish radio voiceover. He worked for 4fm until early 2012.

Greeley is a veteran of Irish radio having worked for many stations such as Millennium 88FM, RTÉ 2fm RTÉ News and RTÉ Radio 1. In May 1994 he joined Dublin's local station 98FM, presenting the weekday Morning News, alongside the Head Teena Gates. Greeley spent 14 years in that post. In 2006 he began a new show on the City Channel called On The Menu programme. In February 2009, after spending 14 years as a newsreader, Greeley left 98FM to join Ireland's new station 4fm, where he started off working Monday to Friday from 9:00 a.m. to 12:00 p.m., then moved to the 11:00 a.m.-3:00 p.m. time slot.

In May 2011, following the schedule changes, he returned to presenting Morning News and Sport
In January 2012, Greeley confirmed his decision to retire from radio broadcasting to concentrate more on voice imaging.

References

1945 births
Living people
Classic Hits (Ireland) presenters
Dublin's 98FM presenters
Irish television personalities
Irish reporters and correspondents
RTÉ Radio 1 presenters
RTÉ 2fm presenters